KQLK is a country formatted broadcast radio station licensed to DeRidder, Louisiana, serving Southwest Louisiana.  KQLK is owned and operated by Cumulus Media.  Its studios are located on Broad Street in downtown Lake Charles and its transmitter is north of Ragley, Louisiana.

History
In September 1991, what was originally KQLK 97.9 was located at 101.7 MHz  and with the callsign KEAZ featuring a country music format. It served primarily the De Ridder, Fort Polk and Leesville, Louisiana market and was owned by DeRidder FM Broadcasting, Inc. The signal was very fringe and almost inaccessible to the Lake Charles and Southwest Louisiana market. In 2000, Pittman Broadcasting, LLC. bought the station and later flipped the station to an FM simulcast of KAOK-AM, a news and talk station in nearby Lake Charles; this time with a new frequency change from 101.7 to 97.9 and a relocated transmitter from Vernon to Beauregard Parish. In 2003, the station switched back to country music as "Country 98", and switched its call sign to the current KQLK. The end result was moderate to below average ratings. In late 2004, the station was bought by Cumulus Media and would change to Hot 97-9; featuring a CHR format with a predominantly hip hop slant. On August 15, 2014, the station switched to country for the third time as one of the first affiliates of Cumulus' Nash Icon network. As of 2017, the station serves the Lake Charles and Southwest Louisiana market but is still licensed to its hometown of De Ridder.

References

External links
97-9 Nash Icon Online

1991 establishments in Louisiana
Country radio stations in the United States
Radio stations established in 1991
QLK
Cumulus Media radio stations